The 1936 All-Southern Conference football team consists of American football players chosen by the Associated Press (AP) and United Press (UP) for the All-Southern Conference football team for the 1936 college football season.

All-Southern Conference selections

Quarterbacks
 Ace Parker, Duke (AP-1)

Halfbacks
Honey Hackney, Duke (AP-1)
 Bill Guckeyson, Maryland (AP-1)

Fullbacks
 Jim Hutchins, North Carolina (AP-1)

Ends
 Andy Bershak, North Carolina (AP-1)
 Bob King, Furman (AP-1)

Tackles
 Joe Brunansky, Duke (AP-1)
 Joe Cardwell, Duke (AP-1)

Guards
 Jim Farley, VMI (AP-1)
 Dick Johnston, Davidson (AP-1)

Centers
 Dan Hill, Duke (AP-1)

Key
AP = Associated Press

UP = United Press

See also
1936 College Football All-America Team

References

All-Southern Conference football team
All-Southern Conference football teams